Gilbert Lennox-King (born 9 April 1947) is a Hong Kong sailor. He competed in the Tempest event at the 1972 Summer Olympics.

References

External links
 

1947 births
Living people
Hong Kong male sailors (sport)
Olympic sailors of Hong Kong
Sailors at the 1972 Summer Olympics – Tempest
Place of birth missing (living people)